("stage German") or  ("stage pronunciation") is a unified set of pronunciation rules for the German literary language used in the theatre of the German Sprachraum.  Established in the 19th century, it came to be considered pure High German. It was codified in the pronouncing dictionary Deutsche Bühnenaussprache, edited by the German scholar Theodor Siebs, and first published in 1898.

An artificial standard not corresponding directly to any dialect, Bühnendeutsch is mostly based on the Standard German as spoken in Northern Germany.  For example, the suffix -ig is pronounced .

Sonorants

Three acceptable realizations of  
Until 1957, only two pronunciations were allowed: an alveolar trill  and an alveolar flap . After 1957, a uvular trill  was also allowed. A voiced uvular fricative , used extensively in contemporary Standard German, is not allowed. Therefore, rot ('red') can be pronounced ,  and  but not .

Rhoticism 

In contemporary Standard German, both of these features are found almost exclusively in Switzerland.

No schwa-elision 
Contrary to Standard German,  cannot be elided before a sonorant consonant (making it syllabic) so Faden 'yarn' is pronounced  rather than the standard .

Fronting of word-final schwa 
In loanwords from Latin and Ancient Greek, the word-final  is realized as a short, tense  so Psyche 'psyche' is pronounced  rather than the standard .

Obstruents

Syllable-final fortition 

Strong aspiration of  
The voiceless plosives  are aspirated  in the same environments as in Standard German but more strongly, especially to environments in which the Standard German plosives are aspirated moderately and weakly: in unstressed intervocalic and word-final positions. The voiceless affricates  are unaspirated , as in Standard German.

Complete voicing of lenis obstruents 
The lenis obstruents  are fully voiced  after voiceless obstruents so abdanken 'to resign' is pronounced . That is in contrast with the Standard Northern pronunciation, which requires the lenis sounds to be devoiced in that position: . Southern standard accents (Southern German, Austrian, Swiss) generally realize the lenis sounds as voiceless in most or all positions and do not feature syllable-final fortition: .

See also 
 Standard German phonology

References

Bibliography 

 

German phonology

ja:ドイツ語音韻論#舞台発音